Juan José Jusid (born September 28, 1941) is an Argentine film director and screenwriter.

Career
Jusid was born in Buenos Aires.  He started his professional career as an actor, puppeteer and stage photographer in the 1960s then switched to film studies at the Association of Short Film Directors.

He turned director and screenwriter in 1968 and has directed acclaimed films such as Bajo Bandera (1997), Un Argentino en New York (1998) and Apasionados (2002).

His films starring actor Miguel Ángel Solá have won a number of Silver Condor awards such as Asesinato en el senado de la nación (1984) and Bajo Bandera (1997).

Personal life
Jusid was married to actress Luisina Brando; they had a son, pianist Federico Jusid.

Filmography
 Mayores palabras (2020)
 Viaje inesperado (2018)
 Historias de diván (mini) TV Series (2013)
 Intolerancia (Short film, 2010)
 Mis días con Gloria (2010)
 Santa Calls (2005) (mini) TV Series
 Ensayo (2003) TV Series (unknown episodes)
 Apasionados (2002)
 Papá es un ídolo (2000)
 Esa maldita costilla (1999)
 Un Argentino en New York (1998)
 Bajo Bandera (1997)
 Muerte dudosa (1994)
 ¿Dónde estás amor de mi vida que no te puedo encontrar? (1992)
 Made in Argentina (1987)
 Asesinato en el senado de la nación (1984)
 Espérame mucho (1983)
 No toquen a la nena (1976)
 Los gauchos judíos (1975)
 La fidelidad (1970)
 Tute Cabrero (1968)

External links
 

1941 births
Living people
Argentine film directors
Argentine screenwriters
Male screenwriters
Argentine male writers
People from Buenos Aires